Peter Blusch (born 11 June 1942 as Peter Bluskowicz) is a former German footballer.

Blusch began his career at Sportfreunde Siegen, before beginning professionally in 1964 for Eintracht Frankfurt. He made it into the first team in Frankfurt and played 110 games altogether. In 1968, he moved to 1. FC Köln, where he played 44 games during a two-year spell. In 1970, Kaiserslautern beckoned, and he played twenty games there. His playing career ended in 1971.

During his whole career, Blusch scored ten goals and did a dance after each one. He also played eight games in the UEFA Cup with 1. FC Köln.

References

1942 births
Living people
German footballers
Eintracht Frankfurt players
1. FC Köln players
1. FC Kaiserslautern players
Sportfreunde Siegen players
Bundesliga players
German football managers
FC Biel-Bienne managers
FC Vaduz managers
Association football defenders